Navarrini is an Italian surname. Notable people with the surname include:

Chiara Navarrini (born 1976), Italian volleyball player
Renato Navarrini (1892–1972), Italian actor
Urano Navarrini (1945–2020), Italian footballer and manager

Italian-language surnames